M. A. Nishad is an Indian film director and screenwriter who has worked predominantly on Malayalam films.

Career
Nishad has often made social dramas in Malayalam, starting his career with Pakal (2006) and Nagaram (2007). In 2009, he worked with Suresh Gopi and Pasupathy on Vairam: Fight for Justice, which was later dubbed into Tamil as Ammu Kolai Vazhakku. In the early 2010s, his Gandhi Square featuring Thilakan failed to materialise. In 2012, he filed a complaint against actress Padmapriya and her manager for raising the cost of his film, No. 66 Madhura Bus (2012).

In 2015, Nishad spoke out against the content from the film, Kohinoor (2015). His actions implied that the makers of the film had tried to make a big film and imitated the style of big films and stars to make it but at last ended up as a mediocre imitation. In 2018, he made Kinar, a bilingual film focusing on the issue of water scarcity in a town between Kerala and Tamil Nadu, and the film starred Jaya Prada and Revathi in the lead roles, with different ensemble casts for the two versions.

Filmography 

 All films are in Malayalam, otherwise noted the language

As actor

References

External links

Living people
Film directors from Kerala
Malayalam film directors
Tamil film directors
21st-century Indian film directors
Year of birth missing (living people)